Jung Eun-ju (Hangul: 정은주, Hanja: 鄭恩朱, born September 30, 1988) is a South Korean short track speed skater. She is the World Record holder for 3000 m.

External links
ShorttrackOnLine.info

1988 births
Living people
South Korean female short track speed skaters
Asian Games medalists in short track speed skating
Short track speed skaters at the 2007 Asian Winter Games
Asian Games gold medalists for South Korea
Asian Games silver medalists for South Korea
Asian Games bronze medalists for South Korea
Medalists at the 2007 Asian Winter Games
21st-century South Korean women